Netgear Switch Discovery Protocol (NSDP) is a management protocol for several network device families, designed by Netgear.

Message structure

Common message header

Message body record structure 
Message body records are type–length–value (TLV) structures. Type field may be one of following values in the table(list in incomplete):

Protocol flow examples 
Network devices discovery (MAC-address an device model discovery):
    Host with MAC=XX:XX:XX:XX:XX:XX from UDP-port 63321 or 63323 sending packet to broadcast IP-address 255.255.255.255 and UDP-port 63322 or 63324
    Header    @0x00000000 0x01 0x01 0x000000000000 0xXXXXXXXXXXXX 0x000000000000 0x0000 0x0001 0x4E534450 0x00000000
    Body      @0x00000020 0x0001 0x0000 0x0004 0x0000
    Marker    @0x00000028 0xFFFF0000

    EACH Device responds with message like
    Header    @0x00000000 0x01 0x02 0x000000000000 0xXXXXXXXXXXXX 0xYYYYYYYYYYYY 0x0000 0x0001 0x4E534450 0x00000000
    Body      @0x00000020 0x0001 0x0028 0x47 0x53 0x31 0x30 0x35 0x45 0x20*0x22 0x0004 0x0006 0xYYYYYYYYYYYY
    Marker    @0x00000058 0xFFFF0000

Device support for protocol 
 GS105E ProSAFE Plus
 GS108E ProSAFE Plus
 GS724T
 GS748T
 FS116E (IP-network description and Firmware version TLVs are not supported)
 FS726TP (uses 63323 and 63324 UDP-ports for interconnection)

Devices firmware update  
Device firmware update is made with TFTP protocol, but you need to send NSDP request to turn on TFTP-server first.

See also 
 IP
 UDP
 MAC
 Netgear

External links 
 NETGEAR official site
 openSource Perl-written cross-platform toolkit for NSDP managed devices project site (in russian)
 LinNetx openSource C-written utility for ProsafePlus switches management via NSDP, not operational
 ngadmin C-written admin utility; GPLv2 license
 ProSafeLinux Remark: sparse information; FreeBSD license
 NSDP Protocol Wireshark dissector Remark: GPL license
 Nsdtool – a toolset of scripts to detect NETGEAR switches in local networks
 NETGEAR firmware update

NSDP
Internet protocols
Network management
Network protocols
Ethernet